Emmaus Bible College is a private Bible college in Dubuque, Iowa, affiliated with the Plymouth Brethren. It offers double majors in both professional and biblical studies. It was established as Emmaus Bible School in 1941 in Toronto, Ontario, by Ed Harlow, John Smart, and Ernest Tatham.  Emmaus began offering correspondence courses a year later, with the target audience being military personnel. The college relocated to Chicago, Illinois, in 1947; in 1984, it moved to where it is now located at 2570 Asbury Rd, Dubuque, Iowa. It was then renamed Emmaus Bible College. The college is in a large facility that was formerly home of Aquinas Institute of Theology, a Roman Catholic institution.

Emmaus has been a member of the Evangelical Training Association (ETA) since 1956. The college is accredited by the Association for Biblical Higher Education and the Higher Learning Commission. Emmaus is also a member of the Association of Christian Schools International and of the International Assembly for Collegiate Business Education.

Around half of Emmaus Bible College students come from Brethren backgrounds, while the other half come from other evangelical backgrounds.  Emmaus offers bachelor's degrees and associate degrees in Biblical and ministry-related fields as well as professional studies.  In addition to its campus program, Emmaus offers a distance learning program that provides college credit for courses taken online. One of its sister organizations, Emmaus International, offers bible-based correspondence courses in 105 countries and in 125 languages. Emmaus has a sister institution in Australia, Emmaus Bible College, Australia.

The school offers men's and women's basketball, men's soccer, and women's volleyball on the intercollegiate level.

References

External links 
Official website
Official athletics website

Bible colleges
Buildings and structures in Dubuque, Iowa
Education in Dubuque, Iowa
Educational institutions established in 1941
Plymouth Brethren
Religion in Dubuque, Iowa
Seminaries and theological colleges in Iowa
1941 establishments in Iowa